Kevin J. Walsh is an American film producer. He is best known for producing the critically acclaimed film Manchester by the Sea (2016) through his production company, B Story, in which he earned an Academy Award for Best Picture nomination with Matt Damon, Kimberly Steward, Chris Moore, and Lauren Beck.

Walsh is the president of Scott Free Productions, a film and television production company established by Ridley Scott and Tony Scott in 1995.

Walsh got his start in the film business working as an assistant to Scott Rudin on seven films including The Royal Tenenbaums, and later for Steven Spielberg on films including Munich. Walsh also was cast as an actor in The Master.

Filmography
He was a producer in all films unless otherwise noted.

Film

Miscellaneous crew

As an actor

As writer

Second unit director or assistant director

Television

As an actor

Awards and nominations 
 Nominated: Academy Award for Best Picture - Manchester by the Sea

References

External links
 

Living people
Film producers from California
1975 births
People from San Diego